In geometry, the gyroelongated cupolae are an infinite set of polyhedra, constructed by adjoining an n-gonal cupola to an 2n-gonal antiprism.

There are three gyroelongated cupolae that are Johnson solids made from regular triangles and square, and pentagons. Higher forms can be constructed with isosceles triangles. Adjoining a triangular prism to a square antiprism also generates a polyhedron, but has adjacent parallel faces, so is not a Johnson solid. The hexagonal form can be constructed from regular polygons, but the cupola faces are all in the same plane. Topologically other forms can be constructed without regular faces.

Forms

See also
 Elongated cupola
 Elongated bicupola

References
Norman W. Johnson, "Convex Solids with Regular Faces", Canadian Journal of Mathematics, 18, 1966, pages 169–200. Contains the original enumeration of the 92 solids and the conjecture that there are no others.
  The first proof that there are only 92 Johnson solids.

Polyhedra